Minderoo Station, commonly referred to as Minderoo, is a pastoral lease that once operated as a sheep station but now operates as a cattle station in Western Australia.

Description
The property spreads out from the river forming a vast plain of sand and clay.
The word Minderoo is Aboriginal in origin and means "place of permanent and clean water".

History
The station was initially formed by E.T. Hooley, who was given the pastoral lease in 1867 by the colonial Government of Western Australia as a reward for creating a stock route from Perth to Roebourne. By 1869, the local Aboriginal population began to use force to try to break the British occupation of their land. One of Hooley's shepherds, a man named Hill, was found dead and it was presumed he was killed by Aboriginals.  The death was reported to authorities at Roebourne and two subsequent punitive missions were organised. The first was led by Hooley, who assembled the men working on the station and went out with them to attack a nearby native campsite. The resulting "skirmish was brief and effective". An armed Government force from Roebourne arrived a couple days later under the leadership of Farquhar MacRae. This group, together with Hooley and his men, implemented an early dawn attack on another Aboriginal settlement. The resulting episode of frontier conflict was dubbed the Battle of Minderoo. A poem was written about the battle, which described it as "fierce, with casualties and woes", but the result was a massacre of Indigenous people with little wounding of the British combatants. Despite their victory in the conflict, Hooley had to abandon the property not long after, due to continued Aboriginal resistance.  

The property wasn't taken up again until the Forrest brothers secured the leasehold in 1878.
David Forrest was the initial manager, and the property was owned by his brothers, John and Alexander Forrest, along with Septimus Burt.  Minderoo was owned by the Forrest family until it was sold in 1998 by Donald Forrest due to relentless drought and debt. Donald's son, the mining magnate Andrew Forrest, whose early years were spent as a jackaroo at Minderoo, bought the property in 2009 for 12 million.

Once the Forrest and Burt syndicate had acquired the lease, David Forrest overlanded 2,000 sheep to Minderoo. By 1884, the property was supporting a flock of 16,000 sheep, approximately 800 cattle and 80 horses.

In 1888, a fire destroyed the kitchen and its contents along with one side of the homestead; David Forrest was injured during the blaze. By 1891 the size of the flock was estimated to be 50,000 sheep, cattle and horses. The partnership of Forrest, Burt and Company was dissolved in 1901. The Forrests were now sole owners of Minderoo and had appointed Arthur Bailey as the station manager. In 1906, Minderoo was carrying a flock of approximately 33,000 sheep.

Employees at Minderoo felt an air shock and heard a rumble of the first British nuclear tests on Monte Bello Island in 1952.
In 1954, Jack Reynolds was hired to cull feral cattle from the property.

After buying back Minderoo in 2009, Andrew Forrest hired Phil Clark to manage the property. Clark reduced the herd size from 11,000 to 3,500 head of cattle to give the land a chance to regenerate. A weir was also installed on the Ashburton to guarantee water supply and assist in regeneration of the river.

The Forrests introduced Droughtmaster, Red Angus, Ultra Black Angus bulls onto Minderoo to build a composite herd for the fine dining market. By 2015, they had announced that they would be seeking organic certification for the property.

In 2017, it was reported that Andrew Forrest had plans to use centre-pivot irrigation to produce melons, onions, potatoes and sweet potatoes on up to 1000 hectares. In 2017, Minderoo Station was already producing 120 hectares of Rhodes grass as cattle feed using this irrigation method.

See also
List of ranches and stations

References

External links
 Battle of Minderoo — full text of the poem at Wikisource

Stations (Australian agriculture)
Pastoral leases in Western Australia
Pilbara
1878 establishments in Australia